The 1999 North Tyneside Metropolitan Borough Council election to the North Tyneside Metropolitan Borough Council were held in 1999 alongside other local elections.

Results

Cullercoats

1999 English local elections
1999